Siarhei Byk (born 8 July 1990) is a Belarusian foil fencer, member of the national team.

Byk earned a silver medal in the 2011 U23 European Championships in Kazan and a bronze medal in the 2013 edition of the same competition in Toruń. He reached the quarter-finals at the 2013 European Fencing Championships in Zagreb, but was defeated by James-Andrew Davis of Great Britain.

References

External links

 Profile at the European Fencing Confederation

Belarusian male foil fencers
1990 births
Living people
European Games competitors for Belarus
Fencers at the 2015 European Games
Sportspeople from Brest, Belarus
21st-century Belarusian people